During the 1991–92 English football season, Southend United F.C. competed in the Football League Second Division.

Season summary
In the 1991–92 season, Southend finished 12th in the old Second Division, their highest ever position in the Football League to date. On New Year's Day 1992, Southend briefly topped the Second Division but their dreary late season form stopped any hopes of a unique third successive promotion that would have given them a place as a Premier League founder member. Manager David Webb then stepped down.

Final league table

Results
Southend United's score comes first

Legend

Football League Second Division

FA Cup

League Cup

Full Members Cup

Squad

References

Southend United F.C. seasons
Southend United